El estrangulador (English, The Strangler) is a 1994 novel by Manuel Vázquez Montalbán. The book was published on Oct 31, 1994 through Grijalbo Mondadori and focuses around a psychiatric patient that gives a potentially unreliable narration of his life. The book has received some praise for its content and won the Premio de la Crítica Española award in 1995.

Synopsis
The book follows an unnamed narrator that is currently living in a psychiatric hospital. Through the book the narrator talks about the people he has killed and claims to be responsible for a series of murders in Boston. Vázquez Montalbán wrote the book in such a manner that the reader is left to decide whether or not the narrator has committed as many or any of the murders he claims to have performed.

References

1994 novels
20th-century Spanish novels
Novels by Manuel Vázquez Montalbán
Fiction with unreliable narrators